Peoples Party of Arunachal, a regional political party in the Indian state of Arunachal Pradesh. It was founded in September 1977 by Bakin Pertin, Oken Lego and L. Wanglat as president, Vice President and General Secretary of the party. Tomo Riba resigned from PK Thungon government Congress Party and joined PPA as Vice President of the Party. Currently, Kamen Ringu is the Chairman of the party. They were in power in Arunachal until all of their MLAs defected back to Indian National Congress.

On 16 September 2016, 43 MLAs from the ruling party, under the CM Pema Khandu, left Indian National Congress to join  People's Party of Arunachal party, in alliance with Bharatiya Janata Party.

History 

Following the election of Pertin as Member of Parliament organized a meeting in Pasighat in April 1977. In this meeting, the PPA constitution was drafted under the Chairmanship of L.Wanglat who joined Bakin Pertin & Oken Lego. He was Congress General Secretary of Tirap District and also Pradesh Organiser of Seva Dal in the state of Arunachal Pradesh. The People Party of Arunachal for formed. Pertin became the president of the new party. Whilst being the leader of PPA, Pertin was continued to be linked to the Janata Party then in government in Delhi. Pertin had the status of being an 'associated' member of the Janata Party. He later broke his links with the Janata Party after Congress Party lead by CM P.K Thungon merged en-blocked with the Janata Party. Bakin Partin joined INC as an associate member in Parliament while still keeping PPA in Arunachal Pradesh. He was close to Indira Gandhi. Bakin Partin was the first MP to demand the dissolution of the House and called for fresh election 

In 1979, PPA MLA and former Congress Minister Tomo Riba became the first PPA Chief Minister. It was a short-lived government spanning from September 1979 to November 1979 with a total of 47 days. A general election was announced in 1980, Arunachal Pradesh State election was included with the general election to elect the Union Territory MLAs. PPA of Tomo Riba and INC of PK Thungon won 13 each in a house of 30 seats. The rest 6 seats were PPA supported independent members. With Indira Gandhi coming back to Power PPA the first associate of INC became the first victim with its President Bakin Partin losing his MP seat from 2 East MP Constituency with most of its members and independent joining INC Party in Arunachal Pradesh. After this party had little success in Arunachal Pradesh Legislative Assembly.

In 1996, Tomo Riba left the party and joined  Gegong Apang camp. Both the leaders had months of deliberation before Tomo Riba and Gegong Apang patched up their political differences. Tomo Riba contested the West Parliamentary election as independent candidate 1996 and became member of the 11th Lok Sabha with the support of Gegong Apang although Apang was Congress Chief Minister in the state of Arunachal Pradesh.

Currently it is a part of North-East Regional Political Front consisting of political parties of the northeast which has supported the National Democratic Alliance (India).

In December 2015, 30 dissident Indian National Congress MLAs including chief minister, Kalikho Pul joined Peoples Party of Arunachal and formed the government along with Bharatiya Janata Party.

In May 2016, after the Bharatiya Janata Party led National Democratic Alliance formed its first government in Assam, a new alliance called the North-East Democratic Alliance (NEDA) was formed with Himanta Biswa Sarma as its convener. The Chief Ministers of the north eastern states of Sikkim, Assam and Nagaland too belong to this alliance. Thus, the People's Party of Arunachal joined the BJP led NEDA.

All of the 30 MLAs returned to Indian National Congress on 16 July 2016 and Pema Khandu was sworn in as the Chief Minister of Arunachal Pradesh.

On 16 September 2016, 43 MLAs from the ruling party, under the CM Pema Khandu, left Indian National Congress to join  People's Party of Arunachal party, in alliance with Bharatiya Janata Party. Though Pema Khandu is still the Chief minister, it is soon expected that either a coalition government will be formed with BJP as the speaker of assembly has also changed sides with the CM, or that the Indian Government will dissolve the state assembly for a fresh general elections.

In October 2016, Pema Khandu, Chief Minister of Arunachal Pradesh formally joined hands with Bharatiya Janata Party, making Arunachal Pradesh 14th state to have BJP in Power, and with this new coalition, Tamiyo Taga sworn-in as Cabinet minister of Arunachal Pradesh.

On December 21, 2016, Pema Khandu  was suspended from the party by the party president Kahfa Bengia and Takam Pario was named as the next likely Chief Minister of Arunachal Pradesh replacing Khandu after People's Party of Arunachal suspended Khandu along with 6 other MLAs.

On December, 2016, Pema Khandu proved majority on the floor with 33 of the People's Party of Arunachal’s 43 legislators joining the Bharatiya Janata Party as the BJP party increased its strength to 45 and it has the support of two independents.  He became second Chief Minister of Arunachal Pradesh of Bharatiya Janata Party in Arunachal Pradesh after 44 days lead Gegong Apang government in 2003.

Electoral history

List of Chief Ministers

 Tomo Riba
 First term (18 September 1979 – 3 November 1979).
 Kalikho Pul
 First term (19 February 2016 – 13 July 2016).
 Pema Khandu
 First term (16 September 2016 – 31 December 2016).

References

External links
 Tomo Riba Bakin Pertin
 "45 Congress MLA With CM Pema Khandu Join Peoples Party Of Arunachal"

 
Political parties established in 1977
1977 establishments in Arunachal Pradesh
Recognised state political parties in India
Regionalist parties in India
Political parties in Arunachal Pradesh